Thirtysomething is an American television series.

Thirtysomething or 30-something may also refer to:

 Thirty Something (Taiwanese TV series), a Taiwanese television series
 Thirtysomething (age), a term of approximation denoting one who is, or who is believed to be, in one's thirties

See also
 30 Something, an album by Carter the Unstoppable Sex Machine
 30 Something (Orbital album), a 2022 greatest hits album by Orbital
 Twentysomething (disambiguation)